Mystica is the eleventh album by German melodic hard rock and power metal guitarist Axel Rudi Pell, released in 2006.

The final artwork was done by Colombian illustrator Felipe Machado Franco, Axel explained the artwork: "The 5 knights are on their way home now since they released their crown back from the evil breed during their visit at the "Kings and Queens" castle. Their way will lead them back passing the "Shadow Zone" and sailing on through the "Oceans Of Time".Of course it is a rather mystical travel and they are attacked by various creatures... I included some of this lyrical content in a few of the new songs, but not in all of em."

Track listing
 "The Mysterious Return" (Intro) - 1:18
 "Fly to the Moon" - 5:33
 "Rock the Nation" - 5:29
 "Valley of Sin" - 7:10
 "Living a Lie" - 5:27
 "No Chance to Live" - 6:18
 "Mystica" - 8:26
 "Haunted Castle Serenade (Opus #4 Grazioso E Agresso)" - 3:52
 "Losing the Game" - 4:35
 "The Curse of the Damned" - 9:57

Personnel
Johnny Gioeli - vocals
Axel Rudi Pell - guitar
Volker Krawczak - bass guitar
Mike Terrana - drums
Ferdy Doernberg - keyboards

External links
Mystica at Axel Rudi Pell.de
[ Mystica at AllMusic.com]

Axel Rudi Pell albums
2006 albums
SPV/Steamhammer albums